The Cape Melville tree frog (Ranoidea andiirrmalin) is a species of frog in the subfamily Pelodryadinae. It is endemic to Australia, and has been found only in Queensland, in Cape Melville National Park. Its natural habitats are subtropical or tropical moist lowland forests and rivers.

It was first described by Keith McDonald in 1997 as Litoria andiirrmalin, but was transferred to the genus Ranoidea, by Dubois and Frétey in 2016.

References

Ranoidea (genus)
Amphibians of Queensland
Amphibians described in 1997
Taxonomy articles created by Polbot
Frogs of Australia
Taxobox binomials not recognized by IUCN